Tristan Traugott (born 4 February 1997) is a South African cricketer. He made his List A debut for Northern Cape in the 2018–19 CSA Provincial One-Day Challenge on 4 November 2018. He made his first-class debut for Northern Cape in the 2018–19 CSA 3-Day Provincial Cup on 15 November 2018.

References

External links
 

1997 births
Living people
South African cricketers
Northern Cape cricketers
Place of birth missing (living people)